Hans Folke "Hasse" Alfredson (28 June 1931 – 10 September 2017) was a Swedish actor, film director, writer, and comedian. He was born in Malmö, Sweden. He is known for his collaboration with Tage Danielsson as the duo Hasse & Tage and their production company AB Svenska Ord ("Swedish Words Ltd"). His most celebrated contribution to their brand of humorist humanism was his ability to extemporize wildly absurd comic situations, for example in the Lindeman dialogues.

Towards the end of his life, Alfredson made it clear that he preferred his real name, Hans, over the commonly used nickname "Hasse".

He was the father of directors Daniel and Tomas Alfredson.

Career

Through his collaboration with Danielsson, with whom he produced several revue shows and films, Alfredson became one of Sweden's best-known comedians and a major, enduringly popular celebrity. Already in 1970, however, he performed a less sympathetic role in Grisjakten. Later in his life, Alfredson would more or less completely turn around to become an author and director of serious, non-comedic works. In 1982 he directed and starred as the antagonist in the film The Simple-Minded Murderer, based on his novel "En ond man" ("An Evil Man"). With just a brief return to revue comedy in 1984, he rarely revisited the genre after the 1985 death of Tage Danielsson. In addition to shows and movies, he authored numerous books, including Monty Python-style comedies as well as tragic and melancholy works.

Between 1992 and 1994, Alfredson was head of the open-air museum Skansen in Stockholm.

In the mid-00s, Alfredson participated in the Danish TV series The Eagle. His last cinematic work was the 2009 adaption of Stieg Larsson's novel The Girl Who Kicked the Hornets' Nest, directed by his son Daniel Alfredson.

Awards

His work, alone and with Danielsson, won several awards. At the 11th Guldbagge Awards, he won the Best Director award for his 1975 film Egg! Egg! A Hardboiled Story. His 1981 film The Simple-Minded Murderer won three awards at the 18th Guldbagge Awards and was entered into the 32nd Berlin International Film Festival. His 1985 film False as Water won the award for Best Director at the 21st Guldbagge Awards.

Selected works

Acting

1958: A Difficult Parish – Redaktör
1963: Havoc in Heaven – Storyteller (Sweden) (voice)
1964: Swedish Portraits – Timjan
1965: Docking the Boat – Garbo
1967: Stimulantia – Jacob Landelius
1967: Skrållan, Ruskprick och Knorrhane – Ruskprick
1968: Lådan
1968: Shame – Fredrik Lobelius, antikhandlare
1968: Out of an Old Man's Head – Gubben – Johan Björk
1970: Grisjakten – Lennart Siljeberg
1970: Pippi on the Run – Konrad
1971: The Emigrants – Jonas Petter
1971: The Apple War – Severin Lindberg
1972: The New Land – Jonas Petter
1974: Dunderklumpen! – Bee (voice)
1974: Gangsterfilmen – Manager at the pool hall
1975: Egg! Egg! A Hardboiled Story – Tramp
1975: Release the Prisoners to Spring – Erlandsson
1977: Games of Love and Loneliness – Freutiger
1978: The Adventures of Picasso – Don José
1981: Sista budet – Joakim Berger
1981: SOPOR – Åtskilliga typer
1982: The Simple-Minded Murder – Höglund
1983: P & B – Drunkard
1985: False as Water – Clara's Father (uncredited)
1987: Jim & piraterna Blom – Kolavippen
1989: The Journey to Melonia – Slagg (voice)
1990: Macken – Roy's & Roger's Bilservice – Edvard, the father
1991: The Great Day on the Beach – Morfar
1992: The Best Intentions – Kyrkoherde Gransjö
1993: Drömkåken – Hans Alfredson
1996: Jerusalem – Mats Hök
1996: Private Confessions (TV Movie) – Biskop Agrell
1999: Sophie's World – Socrates
2000: Hundhotellet – Sture (voice)
2004: Dag och Natt – Bilisten
2008: Everlasting Moments – Prison Guard
2009: Gnomes and Trolls: The Secret Chamber – Leif (voice)
2009: The Girl Who Kicked the Hornets' Nest – Evert Gullberg
2012: Isdraken – Janitor

Directing
1975: Egg! Egg! A Hardboiled Story
1982: The Simple-Minded Murderer
1985: False as Water
1987: Jim & Piraterna Blom
1988: Vargens tid

Books 

1961: En liten bok om att bränna löv, ris, kvistar och annat avfall i ett hörn av trädgården
1962: Ernst Semmelmans minnen
1963: Gentlemannens årsbok. Kalender från Mosebacke (with Carl-Uno Sjöblom)
1965: Blommig falukorv och andra bitar för barn
1966: Gummitummen - Skizzer ur en fren dagbok
1967: Å, vilken härlig fred! (with Tage Danielsson)
1967: Rosa rummet eller Operabaren eller dylikt
1968: F. En överdriven äventyrsberättelse
1968: Varför är det så ont om Q? (for children)
1975: Ägget är löst
1976: Bästa vägen till Muckle Flugga (with Kim Meurling)
1976: Svea Hunds limerickar
1979: Den befjädrade ormen
1980: Varför stirrar ni på mina fötter? (with Stig Claesson)
1980: En ond man
1981: Tiden är ingenting
1983: Lagens långa näsa (21 crime fiction short stories)
1985: En något större bok (collection)
1986: Svenska Ord i toner (with Tage Danielsson)
1986: Jim & piraterna Blom (with Stellan Skarsgård and Stina Jofs)
1986: Vanliga palsternackan för gottegrisar året 1987 (with Povel Ramel)
1990: Nilsson & Olsson or Lämmeleffekten (stage play)
1991: När månen gick förbi (with illustrations by Per Åhlin) (for children)
1992: En yxa i nacken
1992: När Soft var barn (with illustrations by Per Åhlin)
1993: Septemberfortaellinger
1994: Avbrott
1996: Blomstervers (poems, with illustrations by Klara Alfredson)
1996: Attentatet i Pålsjö skog
1998: Varje dag en fest (with Kim Meurling) (illustrated by Per Åhlin).
1999: De döda kring Maria
2001: Nytidens slott och herresäten (with Lars Olson)
2004: Åtta glas (short story)
2004: Grus – släkten som förändrade världen (with illustrations by Per Åhlin)

References

External links

1931 births
2017 deaths
Actors from Malmö
Swedish entertainers
Swedish-language writers
Swedish male actors
Swedish film directors
Sommar (radio program) hosts
People from Helsingborg
Lund University alumni
Litteris et Artibus recipients
Swedish comedians
Best Director Guldbagge Award winners